Tara Iyer (Tārā Āyara) is a former professional tennis player from India. She won four ITF singles titles and one doubles title.

Personal life
Tara Iyer was born in the Indian metropolis of Hyderabad. Her mother is noted IRS officer, Indira Iyer and father is Parmeshwaran Iyer, an IAS officer.

Career

2003-2010
Iyer played at the 2006 Sunfeast Open – Singles qualifying where she won in the first round against Isha Lakhani 6–4, 6–2, before losing to Rushmi Chakravarthi 5–7, 4–6.

Iyer got a wildcard to play at the 2007 Bangalore Open where she lost to Dominika Cibulková 0–6, 2–6 in round one.

Iyer also played for India Fed Cup team in the 2007 Fed Cup Asia/Oceania Zone when she beat Sahar Al Disi of Jordan, 6–0, 6–0, but lost to Albina Khabibulina of Uzbekistan, 4–6, 6–7(3).

She received another wildcard to play at the 2007 Sunfeast Open where she lost her first-round match against Flavia Pennetta, 3–6, 1–6.

2011
Iyer played at the 2011 Citi Open – Singles qualifying, also as a wildcard, against Līga Dekmeijere in the first round and lost 6–7(4), 2–6.

ITF Circuit finals

Singles (4–0)

Doubles (1–2)

References

External links
 
 

1988 births
Indian female tennis players
Racket sportspeople from Hyderabad, India
Living people
Tennis players at the 2010 Asian Games
Sportswomen from Andhra Pradesh
21st-century Indian women
21st-century Indian people
Asian Games competitors for India